There are many cases where a subnational territory (a federated state, municipality, or other unit) is governed from a capital city that is not itself a part of that territory. In most of these cases, the city itself is constituted as a separate local government unit, but also administers a surrounding or neighbouring territory. In cases such as Andhra Pradesh in India, a new state Telangana is created by division which has the capital, but still Andhra Pradesh is administered from the same capital.

Current

Africa
 Addis Ababa, Ethiopia - capital of the region of Oromia (in addition to being the national capital city), itself an independently governed chartered city that is not part of Oromia. 
 Bujumbura, Burundi – capital of both Bujumbura Mairie and Bujumbura Rural provinces; the city itself is located in the former
 East London, South Africa – administrative centre of the Amathole District Municipality, itself in the Buffalo City Metropolitan Municipality
 Francistown, Botswana – capital of the North-East District, itself a separately administered urban district.
 Port Elizabeth, South Africa – administrative centre of the Cacadu District Municipality, itself in the Nelson Mandela Bay Metropolitan Municipality

Americas
 Bogotá, Colombia – capital of the surrounding Cundinamarca Department, while constituting its own capital district.
 Hot Springs, South Dakota, United States – seat of Fall River County, whose administration is under contract from neighbouring Oglala Lakota County to also perform the latter's administrative functions.
 King Salmon, Alaska, United States –  seat of government for the Lake and Peninsula Borough but lies in the Bristol Bay Borough.
 London, Ontario, Canada - seat of Middlesex County, itself an independent city.
 Ontario, Canada - since the municipal restructuring of the 1990s, many of the remaining two-tier counties are administered from separated municipalities that are no longer included within the county; for example, the seat of Wellington County is in Guelph.
 Paramaribo, Suriname – the vast and sparsely populated Sipaliwini District in the South of the country does not have a capital, and is administered from a distance directly by the central government, in the national capital city of Paramaribo on the coast. Paramaribo does not even border the Sipaliwini District.
 Recife, Brazil – seat of the administration of the Fernando de Noronha islands. The Atlantic archipelago of Fernando de Noronha is a unique case in Brazil of a state district, not part of any municipality and administered directly by the government of the state of Pernambuco.
 Thessalon, Ontario, Canada – seat of Cockburn Island township, itself a separate municipality on the mainland. Cockburn Island, in Lake Huron, has no longer any permanent population, yet it is still legally incorporated as a township of the province of Ontario, with the administrative offices located in Thessalon.
 Virginia in the United States – has unique laws regarding independent city status, where a city is not part of its surrounding county.  Because of this, many county courthouses and county government offices are technically located outside of the county. These include Albemarle County, Alleghany County, Augusta County, Bedford County, Frederick County, Greensville County, Prince William County, Rockbridge County, and Rockingham County. The government offices for Roanoke County, James City County, and Henrico County are located within the borders of the county while the historic courthouses are located in the independent cities of Salem, Williamsburg, and Richmond, respectively. In Fairfax County, the courthouse is situated in an enclave within the city of Fairfax, which is an independent city that is itself an enclave within Fairfax County. This is a rare example of a counter-enclave. The county's government offices are outside of the City of Fairfax's borders.
 Winner, South Dakota, United States – seat of both Tripp and Todd counties, itself located in Tripp County.

Asia
 Bishkek, Kyrgyzstan – capital of Chüy Region which surrounds the city, though the city itself is not part of the region but rather a region-level unit of Kyrgyzstan
 Central, Hong Kong – the area where the district council and district office of the Islands District is located, itself within the Central and Western District
 Chandigarh, India – shared capital of the states of Punjab and Haryana, itself a union territory
 Hyderabad, India – since 2 June 2014, the joint capital of the states of Telangana and Andhra Pradesh. Hyderabad itself is located in Telangana, which was newly carved out of Andhra Pradesh on that date. The Andhra Pradesh Reorganisation Act, 2014 determines that Hyderabad will remain provisionally the capital of both states "for such period not exceeding ten years." Many Andhra Pradesh state government institutions have moved to Vijayawada, which has become de facto the new state capital. On 4 September 2014, it was officially announced that a new, specially planned capital city would be built just outside Vijayawada and would be called Amaravati. Still, until the new capital is completed and officially moved, Hyderabad remains de jure Andhra Pradesh's capital city.
 Ishigaki, Japan – government seat both of the Yaeyama District of Okinawa Prefecture, and of the town of Taketomi, located in that district. Ishigaki itself is a city, outside any district and with its own separate administration.
 Jiagedaqi District, China – administrative centre of the Da Hinggan Ling Prefecture, Heilongjiang Province, itself (nominally) located in Inner Mongolia.
 Kagoshima, Japan – hosts the municipal offices for the island villages of Mishima and Toshima.
 Lankaran, Azerbaijan – capital of Lankaran Rayon, itself administratively separate
 Several provinces of the Philippines technically have their capitals outside their borders when the cities are classified as highly urbanized (independent); by law these cities are not included in any province, although most of the time these cities are tightly connected and were sometimes once part of the province that surrounds them. See cities of the Philippines for a more extensive explanation and the Virginia entry below for a comparison.
 Saipan, Northern Mariana Islands – seat of the mayor office of the largely evacuated Northern Islands Municipality, itself another municipality
 Shaki, Azerbaijan – capital of Shaki Rayon, itself administratively separate
 Shusha, Azerbaijan – capital of Shusha Rayon, itself administratively separate
 Tashkent, Uzbekistan – capital of Tashkent Province, itself an independent city
 Yevlakh, Azerbaijan – capital of Yevlakh Rayon, itself administratively separate
 Ongjin County, Incheon - County office located in Michuhol District because county is composed entirely of islands.

Europe
 Aberdeen, Scotland – Aberdeen was the historic county town of Aberdeenshire but now forms a separate local authority. Aberdeenshire Council's headquarters remain within the city of Aberdeen, the only local authority in Scotland to have its council sit in another local authority area.
 Brussels, Belgium – Brussels is the capital of the Flanders region, while itself being part of the Brussels Capital Region
 Bucharest, Romania – capital of Ilfov County, itself a municipality with special status
 Budapest, Hungary – capital of Pest county, and also the Central Hungarian Region, itself having a county status, thus outside Pest county, but within the Central Hungarian Region
 In Germany, several rural Kreise (districts of a state) have their capitals in larger nearby cities that have their own separate administration (being self governing cities that have both Kreis and city level functions) and are not part of the usually homonymous rural Kreis. Some examples are Karlsruhe, Offenbach, Kaiserslautern, Munich, Kassel, and Osnabrück, but there are many other cases.
 Kyiv, Ukraine – administrative center of Kyiv Oblast, itself a city with special status
 Lyon, France – capital of the Rhône department, though itself the bulk of the administratively separate Lyon Metropolis since 2015
 Minsk, Belarus – administrative center of Minsk Voblast, itself a city with special status of capital
 Moscow, Russia – capital of Moscow Oblast, itself a federal city
 Oslo, Norway – administration headquarters of Akershus county, itself a separate county
 Prague, Czech Republic – capital of Central Bohemian Region, Prague-West District and Prague-East District, itself an administrative unit on its own
 Saint Petersburg, Russia – capital of the Leningrad Oblast, itself a federal city
 Sofia, Bulgaria – capital of the Sofia Province, itself an administrative unit (oblast) on its own
 Vilnius, Lithuania - capital of Vilnius district municipality, itself an separate administrative unit (urban municipality).
 Zagreb, Croatia – Capital of Zagreb County, itself administratively separate

Oceania
 Alice Springs, Northern Territory, Australia - seat of three distinct local government areas of the Northern Territory: the Central Desert Region, the MacDonnell Region, and itself, the Town of Alice Springs, which is not part of either region.
 Darwin, Northern Territory, Australia - seat of the separate Tiwi Islands Region of the Northern Territory, itself its own local government area on the mainland as the City of Darwin. Additionally, two areas of the Northern Territory have no local government and are administered directly by the territory's government, and hence from Darwin, the territory's capital city: the Northern Territory Rates Act Area and the Unincorporated Top End Region.
 Honiara, Solomon Islands – capital of Guadalcanal Province, while itself a separate capital territory
 Invercargill, New Zealand – seat of government for the large, rural Southland District to its north while also a territorial authority in its own right.
 Katherine, Northern Territory, Australia - seat of two separate local government areas of the Northern Territory: the Roper Gulf Region and the Victoria Daly Region, while being itself part of neither and its own local government area as the Town of Katherine.
 Mount Gambier, South Australia – seat of government for the District Council of Grant. The city is surrounded by the District Council of Grant but is not actually a part of it, instead being a part of the Mount Gambier local government area.
 Port Augusta, South Australia - one of the two seats that share the administrative functions of the immense but very sparsely populated Outback Communities Authority local government area of South Australia, itself its own separate government area as the City of Port Augusta, which does not even border the Outback Communities Authority area. The other seat is the town of Andamooka, which is within the Outback Communities Authority area.
 Port Moresby, Papua New Guinea – capital of Central Province which surrounds city, but the city itself is in (and also the capital of) the National Capital District

Historical

Africa
 Mafikeng, South Africa – from where the former British protectorate of Bechuanaland, today Botswana, was administered. It is part of South Africa.
 Saint-Louis – The Senegalese city was the administrative capital of the French colony of Mauritania from 1902 to 1960.

Americas
 Havana, Cuba – capital of former La Habana Province, which was distinct from the city of Havana (Ciudad de la Habana), administered separately. A reorganization of Cuban provinces in 2011 split La Habana Province into two new provinces, Artemisa and Mayabeque, their respective capital cities being Artemisa and San José de las Lajas.
 Marshall, Texas, United States, was the capital of the exiled Confederate government of Missouri during the American Civil War.
 Ottawa, Ontario, Canada – location of the 2nd Council of the Northwest Territories from 1905 to 1951

Asia-Oceania
 Busan, South Korea – capital of the province of South Gyeongsang, itself a metropolitan city (from 1963, when the city was separated from the province, to 1983, when it was replaced by Changwon)
 Calicut (Kozhikode), India – until 1964, the administration of the then Union Territory of the Laccadive, Minicoy and Amindivi Islands (now Lakshadweep) was conducted from offices in the city of Kozhikode (better known in English as Calicut), located on the mainland, in the state of Kerala. The territory's government is now seated on the island of Kavaratti.
 Canberra, Australia – seat of government of the Territory of Papua
 Canton (now Guangzhou), China – capital of the province of Kwangtung (now Guangdong), Republic of China, itself a centrally-administered city
 Cotabato City, Philippines – former administrative center of the Autonomous Region in Muslim Mindanao, but itself part of the Soccsksargen region. After a 2019 referendum, the city became part of the newly created Bangsamoro Autonomous Region in Muslim Mindanao, of which it is now the de facto capital.
 Daegu, South Korea – capital of the province of North Gyeongsang, itself a metropolitan city (from 1981, when the city was separated from the province, to 2016, when it was replaced by Andong)
 Daejeon, South Korea – capital of the province of South Chungcheong, itself a metropolitan city (from 1989, when the city was separated from the province, to 2012, when it was replaced by Hongseong)
 Denpasar, Bali, Indonesia – capital of the Regency of Badung, itself an autonomous city, until 2009. Since 2009 Mangupura is the capital of the Regency of Badung.
 Gwangju, South Korea – capital of the province of South Jeolla, itself a metropolitan city (from 1986, when the city was separated from the province, to 2005, when it was replaced by Muan)
 Isabela, Philippines – former capital of Basilan, designated as component city since April 25, 2001. Basilan is previously part of Zamboanga Peninsula and the province of Basilan is transferred to the Autonomous Region in Muslim Mindanao. Isabela is still considered part of the region and still considered part of the province. Since 2017, the seat of the provincial government of Basilan was moved to Lamitan. Isabela still remains part of Basilan provincial services but regional services remains in Zamboanga Peninsula instead of ARMM where the province of Basilan belongs.
 Kuala Lumpur, Malaysia – former capital of the state of Selangor. In 1974, Kuala Lumpur was separated from the state and made into a federal territory. Kuala Lumpur remained the state capital until 1978, when Shah Alam was declared as the new capital.
 Mukden (now Shenyang), China – capital of the province of Fengtian (now Liaoning), Republic of China, itself a centrally-administered city
 Pasig, Philippines – former capital of Rizal and designated as a highly urbanized city since January 21, 1995. Pasig was made a part of Metro Manila since November 7, 1975, taking it outside the border of Rizal. Rizal has moved its provincial government seat to Antipolo, the de facto capital and a component city within its borders, in 2009. Antipolo was made its de jure capital in 2020.
 Peshawar, Pakistan – administrative center of the Federally Administered Tribal Areas (FATA) from Pakistan's independence in 1947 until March 2018, when the FATA were merged into the province of Khyber Pakhtunkhwa, where Peshawar itself was and is located, and of which it is also the capital city.
 Seoul, South Korea – capital of the province of Gyeonggi, itself a metropolitan city (from 1946, when the city was separated from the province, to 1967, when it was replaced by Suwon). It was also claimed as the capital of North Korea until 1972, where the de facto Capital, Pyongyang, was also made the de jure capital.
 Sian (now Xi'an), China – capital of the province of Shensi (now Shaanxi), Republic of China, itself a centrally-administered city
 Xindian, Taiwan – capital of the province of Fukien, Republic of China from 1956 to 1996, itself located in Taiwan Province. Before 1956, the capital was Jincheng; it was moved back to Jincheng in 1996.

Europe
 Berlin, Germany - from 1945 to 1990, the whole city of Berlin was de jure under the authority of the Allied Control Council and part of neither the Federal Republic of Germany nor the German Democratic Republic (GDR), but Allied jurisdiction over East Berlin (officially just the Soviet sector of Berlin in the view of the Western Allies) was not recognized by the GDR. The Eastern half of the city was treated de facto as part of the GDR, it was the seat of the GDR government, and was proclaimed Berlin, Hauptstadt der DDR ("Berlin, capital city of the GDR").
 Burtscheid, Germany – as described above, there are many examples of a German city that serves as capital of an eponymous rural district, but is independent of that district. However, there are many places where this either wasn't the case initially, or where it isn't the case anymore. The former town of Burtscheid (now a neighborhood in Aachen) provides an example of both. It was the capital of Landkreis Aachen from that district's creation until 1897, when Burtscheid was absorbed into the city of Aachen. The district administration did not relocate, meaning the capital of the Landkreis was no longer within its own borders. In 2009, the Landkreis and the city were merged, becoming the Städteregion Aachen, with the administration still located in the Burtscheid neighborhood of Aachen.
 Copenhagen, Denmark – from 1952 to 1992, the administration of Copenhagen County was located on Blegdamsvej in Copenhagen Municipality, which was surrounded by, but not part of the county.
 Kingston upon Thames, United Kingdom – In 1893, Surrey County Council (SCC) moved to Kingston upon Thames. When Greater London was created in 1965, it took in parts of Surrey including Kingston, but the SCC stayed at County Hall. In 2021, the County Council moved to Reigate.
 Sneek, the Netherlands – capital of the municipality of Sneek and nearby Wymbritseradeel
 Stockholm, Sweden – capital of the Stockholm County, itself not a part of the county, administered by the Office of the Governor of Stockholm until 1967 when it was merged into the county
 Tønsberg, Norway – administration headquarters of Sem municipality, itself a separate municipality. In 1988 Sem was incorporated into Tønsberg.
 Vienna, Austria – capital of surrounding Lower Austria, itself a federal state of Austria (until 1986, when it was replaced by Sankt Pölten)

See also
 Temporary capital
 Government in exile

References

Outside the territories they serve